Mutshedzi Dam is a gravity type dam located on the Mutshedzi River, a tributary of the Nzhelele River. It is located 40 km to the west of Thohoyandou, Limpopo, South Africa. It was established in 1990 and serves mainly for irrigation purposes. The hazard potential of the dam has been ranked significant (2).

See also
List of reservoirs and dams in South Africa
List of rivers of South Africa

References 

 List of South African Dams from the Department of Water Affairs and Forestry (South Africa)

Dams in South Africa
Dams completed in 1990